Ball at the Savoy (German: Ball im Savoy) is a 1935 Austrian-Hungarian musical film directed by Steve Sekely and starring  Gitta Alpar, Hans Jaray and Rosy Barsony. Part of the tradition of operetta films, it is based on the 1932 work of the same title by Paul Abraham. It was remade the following year in Britain.

The film's sets were designed by the art director Marton Vincze. The film was shot at the Hunnia Film Studios in Budapest.

Cast
 Gitta Alpar as Anita Helling 
 Hans Jaray as Baron André v. Wollheim 
 Rosy Barsony as Mary v. Wollheim 
 Willy Stettner as Der Zimmerkellner Jean 
 Felix Bressart as Birowitsch, der Sekretär 
 Otto Wallburg as Der Verleger Haller 
 Hermann Blaß as Der Direktor im Grand Hotel 
 Emmi Buttykay as Szobalány 
 Harry Csáktornyai as Táncoló statiszta 
 Oszkár Dénes as Sänger 
 Edit Kállay as Pofozkodó lány 
 László Keleti 
 Lili Székely

References

Bibliography 
 Robert Von Dassanowsky. Austrian Cinema: A History. McFarland, 2005.

External links 
 

1935 films
1935 musical films
Austrian musical films
Hungarian musical films
1930s German-language films
Operetta films
Films based on operettas
Films directed by Steve Sekely
Films scored by Paul Abraham
Hungarian black-and-white films
Austrian black-and-white films